Khalajastan District is a district (bakhsh) in Qom County, Qom Province, Iran. At the 2016 census, its population was 7,207, in 2,792 families.  The District has one city: Dastjerd. The District has two rural districts: Dastjerd Rural District and Qahan Rural District.

Etymology
The name of this district is derived from Khalaj people.

References 

Districts of Qom Province
Qom County